The 2012 VTV Cup Championship was the 9th staging . The tournament was held in Vĩnh Phúc, Vietnam.

Pools composition

Preliminary round

Pool A

|}

|}

Pool B

|}

|}

Final round

5th–8th semifinals

|}

Semifinals

|}

7th place

|}

5th place

|}

3rd place

|}

Final

|}

Awards

MVP:  4.25 Jong Jin Sim
Best Spiker:  Jong Jin Sim
Best Blocker:  Nguyen Thi Ngoc Hoa
Best Server:  Lee Hyo-hee
Best Setter:  Min Ok Ju
Best Receiver:  Yamaghishi Akane
Best Libero:  Yamaghishi Akane
Miss Volleyball:  Misaki Tanaka

References

VTV International Women's Volleyball Cup
VTV
VTV